Onefour was a research substation of Agriculture and Agri-Food Canada that focused on forage and cattle data.

Originally located at (SW15 T1 R4) Township 1, Range 4 the original ranch was given the name "Onefour" as the Onefour grew the headquarters were moved to (SW15 T2 R4) and the name Onefour remained. Onefour once had a store, school and assembly hall and residences for staff. Today only a few staff homes, two duplexes, a cookhouse and offices remain of the locality.

See also 

 List of communities in Alberta
 Agriculture Canada
 Agriculture and Agri-Food Canada
 Prairie Farm Rehabilitation Administration
 Minister of State – Agriculture

References 

Localities in Cypress County
Agriculture in Alberta
Federal departments and agencies of Canada
Agriculture and Agri-Food Canada